Alok Kumar may refer to:
 Alok Kumar (15 March 1972), Indian member of the 14th, 15th and Sixteenth Legislative Assembly of Uttar Pradesh in India
 Alok Kumar (9 February 1986), Indian actor and singer
 Alok Kumar Mehta (3 November 1966), Indian politician from the state of Bihar
 Alok Kumar Rai (20 January 1976), Professor at BHU and VC of Lucknow University
 Alok Kumar Ghosh (7 August 2021), Indian politician from the state of Assam
 Alok Kumar Suman, Indian politician. He was elected to the Lok Sabha, the lower house of the Parliament of India from Gopalganj in the 2019 Indian general election as member of the Janata Dal (United).
 Alok Kumar Majhi, Indian politician member of All India Trinamool Congress
 Alok Kumar Chaurasiya, Indian politician and an MLA elected from Daltonganj block of Jharkhand state as a member of Bharatiya Janata Party 2019.

See also